Antônio Carlos Cerezo (born 21 April 1955), known as Toninho Cerezo, is a Brazilian former footballer. Cerezo is commonly regarded as one of the finest Brazilian defensive midfielders of all time, most notably having played for his hometown's team Atlético Mineiro; he also played for several other clubs in both Brazil and Italy throughout his career. 

At international level, Cerezo took part at the 1978 and 1982 FIFA World Cups – winning a bronze medal in the former edition of the tournament – and the 1979 Copa América, where Brazil finished in third place.

Club career 
Throughout his career, Cerezo played as a defensive midfielder with Atlético Mineiro, Roma,  Cruzeiro, Sampdoria, São Paulo and the Brazil national team.

While playing in Brazil, he won the Bola de Ouro in 1977 and 1980 and the Bola de Prata in 1976.

During his time in Italy, Cerezo won the Coppa Italia four times; in 1991 he won the Serie A with Sampdoria, but lost the Coppa Italia final to A.S. Roma.

With São Paulo he was a two-time winner of the Intercontinental Cup, and also won the Copa Libertadores once. Cerezo was named the best player of the 1993 Intercontinental Cup final.(He scored the second goal and assisted Müller's game-winning goal in a 3–2 victory against Milan.)

In 1997, he retired as a player, and, after doing some studies and probations in Italy, he returned to Brazil, and start a career as a manager at Vitória, reaching the semifinals of the Brasileirão Série A. He also led Japanese powerhouse Kashima Antlers in the J.League for six years. He won five major titles in Japan, two league championships, one Emperor's Cup, and two league cups.

After his time in Japan, he coached Brazilian clubs Atlético Mineiro, and Guarani, as well as some Asian clubs, such as Al-Hilal, Al-Shabab, Al Ain; he later returned to Brazil once again as head manager of Sport Recife, leaving the club just one month later.

International career 

Cerezo won 57 caps (full international games), between March 1977 and June 1985, with the Brazil national team, scoring five goals.

He played in the 1978 FIFA World Cup, where they finished in third place, and in the 1982 FIFA World Cup, where they were eliminated in the second round in a group which contained defending champions and continental rivals Argentina, as well as the eventual champions Italy. He was also due to go to the 1986 tournament, but a hamstring injury in May ruled him out of the upcoming World Cup. He was a member of the Brazilian team that finished in third place at the 1979 Copa América.

At the 1982 FIFA World Cup one of his back passes was intercepted by Italian striker Paolo Rossi, who went on to score; the match ended in a 2–3 loss to Italy, which also saw Rossi score a hat-trick, and as a result, Brazil were knocked out of the tournament in a dramatic upset. For many years after the event, he was widely criticized for this error by many Brazilian fans and members of the press.

Style of play 
A tall and strong midfielder, with a slender frame, Cerezo is regarded as one of the greatest Brazilian defensive midfielders of all time, and was well known for his tireless work-rate, stamina, and tactical awareness, as well as his dynamic, physical, and energetic style of play. Although he was usually deployed in a holding role, Cerezo was also an elegant and highly creative player, who was highly regarded in the media for his technique, vision, ability to understand the game, and passing range, which enabled him to orchestrate attacking moves for his team, get forward, and create chances for teammates after winning back possession; as such, he often functioned as a deep-lying playmaker in midfield throughout his career. Although he was mainly a team player, who preferred to assist other players over scoring himself, he also possessed an accurate shot.

Personal life 
Cerezo is Roman Catholic
 and is father of four children, including fashion model Lea T.

Career statistics

Club

International

Managerial statistics

Honours

Player

Club 
Nacional
Campeonato Amazonense: 1974

Atlético Mineiro
Campeonato Mineiro: 1976, 1978, 1979, 1980, 1981, 1982, 1983
Campeonato Brasileiro Série A: 1977 runner-up, 1980 runner-up

Roma
Coppa Italia: 1984, 1986
European Cup: 1984 runner-up

Sampdoria
Serie A: 1990–91
Coppa Italia: 1988, 1989
UEFA Cup Winners' Cup: 1990
European Cup: 1992 runner-up
Supercoppa Italiana: 1991

São Paulo
Campeonato Paulista: 1992
Copa Libertadores: 1993
Supercopa Libertadores: 1993
Recopa Sudamericana: 1993
Intercontinental Cup: 1992, 1993

Individual 
 South American U-20 Championship Top Scorer: 1977
 Bola de Ouro: 1977, 1980
 Bola de Prata: 1976, 1977, 1980
 FIFA XI (Reserve): 1979
 World XI Soccer: 1983
 Intercontinental Cup Most Valuable Player of the Match Award: 1993
 A.S. Roma Hall of Fame: 2016

Manager

Club 
Kashima Antlers
J.League: 2000, 2001
J.League Cup: 2000, 2002
Emperor's Cup: 2000
Suruga Bank Championship: 2013

Al-Shabab
UAE Football League: 2008

References 

Enciclopédia do Futebol Brasileiro, Volume 1 – Lance, Rio de Janeiro: Aretê Editorial S/A, 2001.

External links 

1955 births
Living people
Footballers from Belo Horizonte
Brazilian people of Spanish descent
Brazilian footballers
1978 FIFA World Cup players
1982 FIFA World Cup players
Brazil international footballers
Brazilian expatriate footballers
Expatriate footballers in Italy
Campeonato Brasileiro Série A players
Serie A players
Brazilian football managers
Expatriate football managers in Japan
Brazilian expatriate sportspeople in the United Arab Emirates
Campeonato Brasileiro Série A managers
Clube Atlético Mineiro players
Nacional Futebol Clube players
A.S. Roma players
U.C. Sampdoria players
Cruzeiro Esporte Clube players
Paulista Futebol Clube players
São Paulo FC players
América Futebol Clube (MG) players
Copa Libertadores-winning players
Esporte Clube Vitória managers
J1 League managers
Kashima Antlers managers
Guarani FC managers
Clube Atlético Mineiro managers
Al Hilal SFC managers
Al Shabab Al Arabi Club managers
Al Ain FC managers
Sport Club do Recife managers
Association football midfielders
Brazilian Roman Catholics